Clyde Anton was an American professional basketball player. He played for the Columbus Athletic Supply in the National Basketball League and averaged 1.4 points per game during 1937–38.

References

Year of birth missing
Year of death missing
American men's basketball players
Columbus Athletic Supply players
Guards (basketball)